Ali-qoli Khan, commonly known by his regnal title Adel Shah (also spelled Adil; , "the Just King") was the second shah of Afsharid Iran, ruling from 1747 to 1748. He was the nephew and successor of Nader Shah, the founder of the Afsharid dynasty.

Adel Shah ruled a considerably smaller realm than that of his predecessor. His rule was only secured in eastern Iran, and he later attempted to secure it in western Iran as well. Unsuccessful, he was soon deposed by his brother Ebrahim Afshar, who had established his rule in western Iran and now declared himself shah.

Family and early career
Not much is known about the life of Ali-qoli Khan before his secession to the Afsharid throne. He was the eldest son of Ebrahim Khan, a brother of Nader Shah, the founder of the Afsharid dynasty of Iran. Ali-qoli Khan attended the coronation of Nader Shah on 8 March 1736, where he was amongst the figures who were adjacent to the latter.

In 1737, Ali-qoli Khan was given the governorship of Mashhad, as well as married Ketevan, daughter of the Georgian king Teimuraz II. In 1740 he was also married to a daughter of Abu al-Fayz Khan, the ruler of the Khanate of Bukhara, which had been recently been subjugated by the Afsharids. From 1743 to 1747, Ali-qoli khan commanded Nader's troops against the Yazidis of Kurdistan, the Karakalpaks and Uzbeks of Khwarazm and in Sistan. He then ran in trouble with his uncle over the latter's decision to levy 100,000 tomans on him combined with Nader's suspiciousness. In April 1747, in conjunction with the rebels of Sistan, Ali-qoli khan occupied Herat and induced the Kurds to enter into a rebellion. Nader, while marching against the insurgents, was murdered by a group of his officers, who then offered the crown to Ali-qoli.

Nader Shah was soon murdered afterwards, by mutinous officers, on June 21, 1747. His death led to a power vacuum, which resulted in his vast empire being divided by various sovereigns. The eastern parts of his domain were seized by Uzbek and Afghan sovereigns; a former Uzbek commander of Nader Shah named Muhammad Rahim Khan Manghit, deposed Abu al-Fayz Khan and became the new ruler of Bukhara; Ahmad Khan, the leader of the Abdali tribe and formerly part of the Afghan cadre of Nader Shah's army, fled to the city of Naderabad in Kandahar. There he assumed the title of Durr-i Durran (Pearl of Pearls) and thus changed the name of his Abdali tribe to "Durrani." Ahmad Khan (now titled Ahmad Shah) then went on conquer what had originally served as the frontier region between the Safavid and Mughal Empire. 

In Mashhad, its civil governor and superintendent of the Imam Reza Shrine, Mir Sayyed Mohammad drove the Afghans out of the city, securing it for Nader Shah's nephew Ali-qoli Khan, who may have had a hand in his uncle's murder. The latter had accepted the assassins of Nader Shah into his service, and had received an invitation to Mashhad by Mir Sayyed Mohammad.

Reign 

On 6 July 1747, Ali-qoli Khan ascended the throne and assumed the regnal name of Soltan Ali Adel Shah. Around the same time, he sent a small force to capture Kalat; the fortress was nearly impenetrable, however, the army eventually breached it by using an abandoned ladder on the edge one of the towers, which demonstrates that they had help from the inside. Adel Shah's men massacred sixteen descendants of Nader Shah, which included three sons of Nader Shah, five sons of Reza Qoli Mirza and eight sons of Nasrollah Mirza. Two sons of Nader Shah, Nasrollah Mirza and Imam Qoli Mirza successfully escaped together with Nader Shah's grandson Shahrokh (who was 14 at the time), but they were soon captured near the city of Marv. While the others were executed, Shahrokh was the only one that was spared, in case his Safavid lineage would come to use. He was instead sent back to Kalat, where he was imprisoned. False news regarding his death soon followed.

Preferring to revel in Mashhad, Adel Shah appointed his younger brother Ebrahim Mirza as the governor of Isfahan and its surroundings. Soon thereafter, Ebrahim declared independence and joined forces with his cousin Amir Aslan Khan Afshar, the governor of Azerbaijan. Adel Shah eventually marched towards his brother, but lost a substantial amount of his men due to desertion, and was consequently defeated (in June 1748) and fled to the town of Tehran. There he was captured and blinded by its governor, Mirza Mohsen Khan, who then gave him over to Mir Sayyed Mohammad. The latter took Adel Shah back to Mashhad, where a group of Turkic, Kurdish and Arab tribal leaders had taken advantage of his absence and declared Shahrokh the new shah on 1 October. Adel Shah was executed at the request of Shahrokh and the mother of Nasrollah Mirza.

References

Sources 
 
 
 
 
 
 
 
 
 
 
 
 
 
 

Afsharid monarchs
Murdered Persian monarchs
Year of birth missing
1749 deaths
18th-century murdered monarchs
Ethnic Afshar people
1749 murders in Asia